Andrew Jenkins (born December 28, 1988) is a Canadian actor, screenwriter, producer, and entrepreneur.

Early life 
Jenkins graduated from the University of British Columbia’s Sauder School of Business, with a degree in Commerce and specialization in Entrepreneurship and completed executive education at the University of Pennsylvania’s Wharton Business School. He trained at the Esper Studio with William Esper in New York City.

Career 
Jenkins has appeared on stage, as well as in numerous film and television roles. His first on screen appearance was in the Saving Grace pilot episode in 2007. Two years later, he starred in the science fiction television series Stormworld (2009). In 2012, he played Scott in the indie film Locked in a Garage Band. In 2013 he had a recurring role as Cody in season 3 of The Killing. In 2015, he played Sir Percival in three episodes of Once Upon a Time. Andrew played Doug Pownall in nine episodes of the Freeform television series Siren in 2018 and 2019.

Teaming up with director Chris Scheuerman, he wrote, produced and acted in psychological thriller Lost Solace. The film premiered at Cinequest Film Festival in San Jose in 2016 and screened at the Cannes Film market where it sold in May, 2016.

Jenkins won the 2011 Young Artist Awards for his recurring role on Tower Prep. He also received two LEO award nominations for his leading performances in Stormworld and Lost Solace.

He was the CEO of zenGOT, an on-demand marketplace platform for home services until the company sold in 2020, and is on the executive team at IAP Career College, He is the founder and CEO of Next Generation Indie Film Awards, a not-for-profit organization that has honored filmmakers including Rian Johnson and Natasha Lyonne, and is executive producer of the organization’s annual galas. Jenkins is a partner and advisor at the Canadian solar energy company Energy Economics.

In 2022 Jenkins produced and acted in the two-person David Ives play Venus in Fur in Vancouver, British Columbia with Leah Gibson.

Filmography

Film

Television

References

External links
 

Living people
Canadian male film actors
Canadian male television actors
1988 births